Vaceuchelus gemmula is a species of sea snail, a marine gastropod mollusk in the family Chilodontidae.

Distribution
This marine species is the only species in the family Chilodontidae to be endemic to South Africa

References

 Turton, W. H. (1932). Marine Shells of Port Alfred, South Africa. Humphrey Milford, London, xvi + 331 pp., 70 pls.

External links
 To World Register of Marine Species
 

Endemic fauna of South Africa
gemmula
Gastropods described in 1932